When the Streetlights Go On is an American streaming television series written by Eddie O'Keefe and Chris Hutton that debuted on Quibi on April 6, 2020.

Premise
After the murder of a beautiful young girl rocks a suburban community, the victim's sister and her high school peers must struggle to find a sense of normalcy while coming of age in the midst of the murder investigation.

Cast 
 Chosen Jacobs as Charlie Chambers
 Sophie Thatcher as Becky Monroe
 Ben Ahlers as Brad Kirchoff
 Sam Strike as Casper Tatum
 Julia Sarah Stone as Berlice Beaman
 Queen Latifah as Detective Grasso
 Tony Hale as Boque
 Mark Duplass as Mr. Carpenter
 Kristine Froseth as Chrissy Monroe

Pilot 2017 
 Max Burkholder as Charlie Chambers
 Odessa Young as Becky Monroe
 Ben Winchell as Brad Kirchhoff
 Adam Long as Casper Tatum
 Kelli Mayo as Berlice Beaman
 Graham Beckel as Detective Hoffman
 Drew Roy as Mr. Carpenter
 Nicola Peltz as Chrissy Monroe

Episodes

Reception 
On Rotten Tomatoes, the series has a 75% rating with an average score of 6.89 out of 10 based on 20 reviews. The site's critical consensus read: "When the Streetlights Go On takes itself a little too seriously, but strong writing, an impressive cast, and most importantly, an intriguing mystery more than make up for it."

References

External links 
 

Quibi original programming
2020s American drama television series
2020 American television series debuts
2020 American television series endings
English-language television shows
Television series about teenagers
American drama web series